A Deep energy retrofit (abbreviated as DER) can be broadly categorized as an energy conservation measure in an existing building also leading to an overall improvement in the building performance. While there is no exact definition for a deep energy retrofit, it can be defined as a whole-building analysis and construction process, that aims at achieving on-site energy use minimization in a building by 50% or more compared to the baseline energy use (calculated using utility bills analysis) making use of existing technologies, materials and construction practices. Such a retrofit reaps multifold (energy and non-energy) benefits beyond energy cost savings, unlike conventional energy retrofit. It may also involve remodeling the building to achieve a harmony in energy, indoor air quality, durability, and thermal comfort. An integrated project delivery method is recommended for a deep energy retrofit project. An over-time approach in a deep energy retrofitting project provides a solution to the large upfront costs problem in all-at-once execution of the project.

Climate Change 

82% of final energy consumption in buildings was supplied by fossil fuels in 2015. The energy-related  emissions account for the environmental impact due to a building. The Global Status Report 2017 prepared by the International Energy Agency (IEA) for the Global Alliance for Buildings and Construction (GABC) highlights the significance of the buildings and construction sector in global energy consumption and related emissions again. Deep energy retrofitting in existing building stocks is critical to achieve the global climate goals laid down in the Paris Agreement.

Deep energy retrofits vs. Conventional energy retrofits
Conventional energy retrofits focus on isolated system upgrades (i.e. lighting and HVAC equipment). These retrofits are generally simple and fast, but they often miss opportunity for saving more energy cost-effectively.

Deep energy retrofits require a systems-thinking approach than the traditional approach followed for a conventional retrofit – home weatherization or typical home performance upgrade. Systems thinking approach is a step ahead of traditional analysis by evaluating the interactions between the different isolated components in the building. For example, Home Performance with ENERGY STAR offers a comprehensive, whole-house approach to improving your home's energy efficiency, comfort and safety while helping to reduce the energy costs only by up to 20%. In addition to the efficiency measures taken for a building, a deep energy retrofit requires occupants’ proactive role in energy conservation. This approach must take into account all the energy uses in the home, as well as the activities of the occupants. Deep energy retrofit projects are an evidence to the fact that technology is available to set the thresholds of energy savings to a limit much higher than that achieved by a conventional retrofits.

Deep energy retrofits achieve much greater energy efficiency by taking a whole-building approach, addressing many systems at once. It is most economical and convenient to take this approach on buildings with overall poor efficiency performance, with multiple systems nearing the end of useful life, and perhaps other reasons.

Opportunity in Deep energy retrofit 
Deep energy retrofits and conventional energy retrofits both undertake different approaches and lead to varied outcomes. In scenarios where capital improvements are being looked forward to in an existing project deep energy retrofit is certainly an upper hand decision to create the most value out of investments in the long term. Deep energy retrofits can be well-timed to reap maximum benefits in such situations.

Occupant behavior 
The overall success of the deep energy retrofit project also depends upon the inclusion of occupants in all the phases of the project. The phases include – project recruitment, project planning and during the use. Occupant behavior requires the project to focus on building owners’ needs and wants as much as the technical specifications. This ascertains actual performance, cost-effectiveness, willingness to progress from a design to an actual implementation, and occupant satisfaction. Also, evidence suggests that our building simulation models can become more accurate for a given house when we include actual operational information, such as thermostat set-points, appliance usage, etc. (Ingle et al., 2012).

Over-time Retrofit 
Over-time retrofit is the implementation of a retrofit project which is planned in a step-by-step manner at intervals of time within a stipulated duration. Such an approach is usually sought for deep energy retrofits over an all-at-once approach to reduce the burden of large upfront costs and break it down into chunks of timely investments. Thus, an over-time retrofit can at times be a more viable option than a conventional deep energy when there are capital constraints. Research in the United Kingdom has demonstrated that retrofits carried out over-time can achieve levels of home performance equal to those achieved by all-at-once DERs (Fawcett, 2013; Fawcett, Killip, & Janda, 2014) and select projects have been successful in the United States. (Less & Walker, 2014). The pros and cons of an Over-time Retrofit are compared as follows (Less & Walker, 2015):

It is important to note that, for example, an overtime retrofit project could be able to stipulate the occupants' need over the time but could perform sub-optimal technically. It could also prove to be costlier. There's a lack of tools to execute over-time projects efficiently.

Strategies to increase success 
Detailed planning must be inculcated from the very beginning. It is recommended to include post-occupancy evaluation at each stage of implementation to deal with modifications required in future stages. Home performance should be tracked at each stage either using utility bills or feedback devices. This helps in achieving the set-target for energy consumption. It must be kept in mind to implement building envelope and passive design elements before making major HVAC and technology investments. This will help to reduce the load parameters for HVAC design. The technology investments should also come later to have an innovation advantage. Over-time retrofits, thus can be guided by these strategies to overcome the challenges and achieve success.

Design and Construction Process

Deep energy retrofit project has different phases governing them – pre-panning, project planning, construction, test out. The beacon for the design and construction process in deep energy retrofit projects is a set of defined project needs, opportunities, goals and objectives. This completely determines the overall project. Walker et al. provide design and construction process guidance which can be followed flexibly in deep energy retrofit projects in residential homes.

Energy efficiency measures
Cluett and Amann (2014) found the most commonly implemented efficiency measures in the US for residential buildings. They are broadly listed as follows:

Building shell improvements 
 Insulation improvements, usually to the foundation walls/slabs, above grade walls, floors, roof, and attic surfaces that make up the thermal envelope
 Attention to air sealing, particularly in areas that are harder to address without being paired with improvements to the insulation shell

Upgrades to heating, cooling, and hot water systems 
 Upgrade to non-atmospheric vented combustion units that either vent directly outside or are electric only
 Upgrade to units that are correctly sized for the heating and cooling load demands of an altered building
 Improvement to or replacement of the existing distribution systems for heating, cooling, and/or hot water, including changes to ductwork, water piping, and wastewater heat recovery

The deep energy retrofit specifications for various elements vary from climate to climate zones.

Process
A Level III energy audit, as defined by ASHRAE, is required in order to complete a commercial building deep energy retrofit. Also known as an investment grade audit, this type of energy audit features analysis of the interactions between efficiency strategies and their life cycle cost. Upon selection and implementation of measures, the energy savings are verified using the International Performance Measurement and Verification Protocol.

Tools
Deep energy retrofits make use of energy modeling tools that integrate with an organization's pro forma or other financial decision making mechanisms. Smartphone technologies have simplified the retrofit process as a number of audit and retrofit tools have appeared over the last 5 years to speed up retrofits and maximize efficiency in the field.

Ratings
A building that has undergone a deep energy retrofit is well positioned for a green building rating such as LEED.

Energy and Non-energy Benefits
There have been a number of studies done to determine and quantify the benefits afforded to owners, tenants, and various other stakeholders from the successful completion of deep energy retrofits. The following tabulation by the Rocky Mountain Institute lays the efficiency measures undertaken in a deep energy retrofit project in correspondence to the building performance improvements and therefore, the quantifiable and non-quantifiable values generated from implementation of such a project.

Policy framework for retrofitting 
A paradigm shift is needed to achieve the motive of climate change mitigation through retrofitting. This shift is underpinned by a greater need to propagate behavioral change rather than just the technology implementation. The framework should move from a project focus outlook towards an understanding of a larger scale execution that includes social awareness and interests. Hence, the need for laying down large scale retrofitting programs that support the idea of cities as active sites to inculcate newer technologies.

Global
"Buildings will also be particularly affected by the effects of climate change: storms, flooding and seepages, reduced durability of some building materials and increased risk of structure damage or collapse (e.g. from severe storms) could all decrease building lifetime, while increasing health-related risks such as deteriorating indoor climate." (The GABC Global Roadmap)

From the industrial revolution, fast forward to a few centuries later. We have come far ahead with global warming and climate change. To counter the global temperature-rise problem, a decision was reached at the Paris agreement in 2015, wherein member nations pledged to maintain temperatures below 2℃, compared to pre-industrial levels.

The Global Status Report 2017 underscores the importance and potential of deep energy retrofitting among other solutions in achieving climate mitigation goals. Deep energy retrofitting is one of the solutions for cutting down the carbon footprint of buildings.

The report found out that buildings & the construction industry together accounted for 36% of global final energy use & 39% of energy-related  emissions. It calls to action for a 30% improvement, by 2030, in energy-use intensity (i.e. energy use per square meter) of the building sector, as compared to the 2015 levels, to achieve the Paris agreement goals successfully.

Though a growing number of countries have laid down policies to buildings energy performance improvements but a rapidly growing buildings sector, especially in developing countries, has offset those improvements. The Report states that the efficiency improvements, including building envelope measures, represent nearly 2400 EJ in cumulative energy offsets to 2060 – more than all the final energy consumed by the global buildings sector over the last 20 years.

It asserts that an aggressive scaling up of deep building energy renovations of the existing global stock is one of the important steps ahead. It points out to refer to Global Alliance for Buildings and Construction (GABC) Global Roadmap for building sector towards sustainability.

The GABC Global Roadmap sets up to 'accelerate the improvement of existing buildings’ performance'''  towards energy-efficient, zero GHG emissions and resilient buildings well before the end of the century taking the following steps globally:
 Significant increase of renovation operations including energy efficiency. Upgrade of the level of energy efficiency of each operation, in line with long-term standards.''

USA
An analysis for 50% dip in energy consumption & carbon emissions by the US by 2050 translates to comprehensive energy efficiency retrofits in more than half the existing buildings (Nadel 2016).

The policy framework for retrofitting in USA is directed at state and local levels. These efforts are supported by the national government. Hundreds of such programs exist, right from the basic energy audits, provision of financial rebates, to comprehensive ones that aim to optimize the entire house.

Carine et al. summarize the below-listed elements present mostly in the best programs:
 Retrofit consultancy for consumers.
 Marketing to boost the demand-supply in this industry.
 Training, certification of retrofit contractors.
 Provision of rebates, upfront discounts.
 Investment in R&D.
 Building-efficiency labelling.

The Home Performance with Energy Star program is run by many bodies in the US, with the aid of the US Department of Energy. This project reports an average cost of $3500 per home retrofitted, with a distribution of 57%, 14%, 29% to homeowner incentives, contractor incentives, & administrative costs respectively.

In the commercial domain, the Energy Star Program by EPA aims to reduce the carbon footprint of buildings. According to this initiative, owners benchmark their buildings on a scale of 1–100. Those scoring 75 & above receive 'Energy Star' designation; while the others are encouraged to follow upgradation strategies for a better performance. Nearly 500,000 properties, representing about half of US commercial building floor area has been benchmarked as of 2016, with a grand total 29,500 buildings receiving the 'Energy Star' rating to that point.

The retrofitting industry is steadily on the rise. Some major obstacles in its path include as found by Carine et al.:
 High initial investment.
 Complexity of retrofits.
 Lack of awareness regarding retrofitting.
 Shortage of affordable financing.

Notable case studies

The Empire State Building
The Empire State Building is undergoing a deep energy retrofit process that is projected to be completed in 2013. Upon completion, the project team, consisting of representatives from Johnson Controls, Rocky Mountain Institute, Clinton Climate Initiative, Jones Lang LaSalle, and NYSERDA will have achieved an annual energy use reduction of 38% and $4.4 million.

A notable achievement of the project is that instead of replacing the chillers as originally planned, the design team were able to first reduce the building's required cooling capacity by 1600 tons, allowing for a chiller retrofit instead of replacement which would have been $17.3 million more in capital costs.

The Indianapolis City-County Building
The City-County Building recently underwent a deep energy retrofit process that is projected to be completed in September 2011. Upon completion, the project team, consisting of representatives from the Indianapolis Marion County Building Authority, Indianapolis Office of Sustainability, Rocky Mountain Institute, and Performance Services will have achieved an annual energy reduction of 46% and $750,000 annual energy savings.

Market sizing

United States 
A business case study by The Rockfeller Foundation sizes the potential of retrofitting market in the USA. Retrofitting offers a burgeoning business market for entrepreneurs, engineers, investors in the USA. It offers a $279 billion investment opportunity. The residential sector, followed by commercial and institutional sectors, offers the largest business impact. Scaling up retrofitting efforts can create 3.3 billion direct and indirect cumulative job years in the United States.

Criticism

Cost-effectiveness
Cost effectiveness can be achieved when the annual energy cost savings can equal or exceed the annual loan costs. Their perfect balance is referred as neutral net-monthly costs. Cost effectiveness could be a key driver in decision making related to deep energy retrofit projects.

A study by Less et al. (2015) found that:
 The most cost-effective projects were the one in poor conditions- low efficiency equipment and little insulation. Such buildings did not pursue deep retrofit.
 The least cost effective projects were the ones having low pre-retrofit utility bills. But they had aggressive retrofit plans. Such a project cannot be said to be a failure because cost-effectiveness may not be the project goal.

Less et al. (2015) found that on average, the U.S. deep energy retrofits were cash-flow neutral on a monthly basis. However, variability was large, with some projects substantially reducing net-monthly costs and others substantially increasing net-costs. Questionable cost-effectiveness is thus, seen as a barrier to widespread of deep energy retrofits. This forms the basis to think of economic value of deep energy retrofit in larger context.

Energy savings and evaluation 
Although many modeling tools are available to assess home energy savings, the inaccuracy of their predictions (compared to actual energy use measurements) limits their usefulness (Osser, Neuhauser, and Ueno 2012). Cluett et al. point that the pilot programs should monitor actual energy savings to evaluate project impact and help calibrate estimation tools. This is important to track, evaluate and verify reality-based energy performance metrics.

See also
 Rocky Mountain Institute
 Efficient energy use
 Quadruple glazing
 Leadership in Energy and Environmental Design
 Sustainable refurbishment
 Zero-energy building
 Zero heating building
 Northwest Energy Efficiency Alliance
 United States Department of Energy
 Energy Savings Performance Contract

References

Low-energy building